Captain Fantastic and the Brown Dirt Cowboy is the ninth studio album by English musician Elton John. The album is an autobiographical account of the early musical careers of Elton John (Captain Fantastic) and his long-term lyricist Bernie Taupin (the Brown Dirt Cowboy). It was released in May 1975 by MCA Records in America and DJM in the UK and was an instant commercial success. The album was certified gold before its release, and reached No. 1 in its first week of release on the US Billboard 200, the first ever album to achieve both honors. It sold 1.4 million copies within four days of release, and stayed in the top position in the chart for seven weeks.

Though they would all appear on later albums, this was the last album of the 1970s with the original lineup of the Elton John Band (guitarist Davey Johnstone, bassist Dee Murray, and drummer Nigel Olsson).  Murray and Olsson, who had formed John's rhythm section since 1970, were fired prior to the recording of the follow-up album Rock of the Westies, while Johnstone would leave in 1978.  This was the last album until 1983's Too Low for Zero that Elton John and his classic band would play on together.

In 2003, the album was ranked number 158 on Rolling Stones list of The 500 Greatest Albums of All Time, maintaining the rating in a 2012 revised list.

History
Written, according to lyricist Bernie Taupin, in chronological order, Captain Fantastic is a concept album that gives an autobiographical glimpse at the struggles John (Captain Fantastic) and Taupin (the Brown Dirt Cowboy) had in the early years of their musical careers in London (from 1967 to 1969), leading up to John's eventual breakthrough in 1970. The lyrics and accompanying photo booklet are infused with a specific sense of place and time that would otherwise be rare in John's music. John composed the music on a ship voyage from the UK to New York.

"Someone Saved My Life Tonight", the only single released from the album (and a number 4 hit on the US Pop Singles chart), is a semi-autobiographical story about John's disastrous engagement to Linda Woodrow, and his related 1968 suicide attempt. The "Someone" refers to Long John Baldry, who convinced him to break off the engagement rather than ruin his music career for an unhappy marriage. It was viewed by Rolling Stone writer Jon Landau as the best track on the album: "As long as Elton John can bring forth one performance per album on the order of 'Someone Saved My Life Tonight', the chance remains that he will become something more than the great entertainer he already is and go on to make a lasting contribution to rock."

In a 2006 interview with Cameron Crowe, John said, "I've always thought that Captain Fantastic was probably my finest album because it wasn't commercial in any way. We did have songs such as 'Someone Saved My Life Tonight,' which is one of the best songs that Bernie and I have ever written together, but whether a song like that could be a single these days, since it's [more than] six minutes long, is questionable. Captain Fantastic was written from start to finish in running order, as a kind of story about coming to terms with failure—or trying desperately not to be one. We lived that story."

John, Taupin and the band laboured harder and longer on the album than perhaps any previous record they'd ever done to that point. As opposed to the rather quick, almost factory-like process of writing and recording an album in a matter of a few days or at most a couple of weeks (as with Goodbye Yellow Brick Road), the team spent the better part of a month off the road at Caribou Ranch Studios working on the recordings. Producer Gus Dudgeon was apparently also very satisfied with the results. The album's producer was quoted in Elizabeth Rosenthal's His Song, an exhaustive detailed accounting of nearly all John's recorded work, as saying he thought Captain Fantastic was the best the band and Elton had ever played, lauded their vocal work, and soundly praised Elton and Bernie's songwriting. "There's not one song on it that's less than incredible," Dudgeon said.

Sequel
The 2006 album The Captain & the Kid is the sequel, and continues the autobiography where Captain Fantastic leaves off.

Cover art
The intricate cover art was designed by pop artist Alan Aldridge, drawing fantastic imagery from the Renaissance painting The Garden of Earthly Delights by Hieronymus Bosch. The original LP package also included two booklets; a "Lyrics" booklet which contained an uncompleted lyric for "Dogs in the Kitchen" that did not appear on the album, and another booklet called "Scraps," which collected photos and snippets of reviews, personal diary entries and other memorabilia of John and Taupin during the years that are chronicled on the album. The original LP also contained a poster of the album's cover.

In 1976, Bally released a Capt. Fantastic pinball machine with artwork by Dave Christensen of Elton John in his "pinball wizard" character from the movie Tommy. In 1977, Bally released a "home model"  version with artwork by Alan Aldridge.

Release and reception

The album reached number 1 in its first week of release on the US Billboard 200, the first ever album to do so, reportedly selling 1.4 million copies within 4 days of release, and it stayed in that position in the chart for seven weeks. It was certified gold based on pre-release orders in early May 1975, two weeks before it was even officially released, and was certified platinum and triple platinum in March 1993 by the RIAA.

In Canada, it also debuted at number 1 on the RPM national Top Albums chart and only broke a run of what would have been fifteen consecutive weeks at the top by falling one position to number 2 in the ninth week (31 May–6 September). On the UK Albums Chart, it peaked at number 2.

In 2003, the album was ranked #158 on Rolling Stone magazine's list of The 500 Greatest Albums of All Time, maintaining the rating in a 2012 revised list.

Later releases
A deluxe 30th anniversary edition CD was released September 2005, containing the complete album and adding "House of Cards", the original B-side to the 7" single of "Someone Saved My Life Tonight", which had previously only appeared on CD on the 1992 Rare Masters collection.  Also included is a second disc containing the complete album performed live at Wembley Stadium on 21 June 1975.

In September 2005, Elton John and his band again performed the entire album (minus "Tower of Babel" and "Writing") in a series of sold-out concerts in Boston, New York City and the tour's final stop, Atlanta, in October. These "Captain Fantastic Concerts" were a part of the Peachtree Road Tour and were the longest concerts in Elton's career, many lasting at least three and a half hours. The songs from Captain Fantastic were aired by Capital Gold Radio in a broadcast taken from 16 September 2005 performance in Boston.

"Curtains", among other songs from the album, was sampled in Pnau's 2012 album Good Morning to the Night.

"We All Fall in Love Sometimes" was covered by Jeff Buckley. It was also covered by Coldplay for the 2018 tribute album Revamp: Reimagining the Songs of Elton John & Bernie Taupin.

Track listing
All songs written by Elton John and Bernie Taupin, except where noted.

Note: On the original DJM Records CD version, "We All Fall in Love Sometimes" and "Curtains" are both combined into one track, making it a nine-track album. On all other CD versions (MCA Records, Polydor and French label Carrere Records), the two tracks are separated.

Bonus tracks (1995 Mercury and 1996 Rocket reissue)

30th Anniversary Deluxe Edition

Personnel 
Track numbers refer to CD and digital releases of the album.

 Elton John – lead vocals, acoustic piano (1, 2, 3, 5, 6, 7, 9, 10), Fender Rhodes (1, 4, 5, 8), clavinet (4, 6), ARP String Ensemble (5), harmony vocals (7, 8), harpsichord (9, 10), mellotron (9, 10)
 David Hentschel – ARP synthesizer (9, 10)
 Davey Johnstone – acoustic guitar (1, 5-10), electric guitar (1-4, 6, 9, 10), mandolin (1), backing vocals (3, 5-10), Leslie guitar (5), acoustic piano (8)
 Dee Murray – bass guitar, backing vocals (3, 5-10)
 Nigel Olsson – drums, backing vocals (3, 5-10)
 Ray Cooper – shaker (1, 5, 8), congas (1, 3, 4, 9, 10), gong (1), jawbone (1), tambourine (1-6, 9, 10), bells (3, 9, 10), cymbals (5), triangle (7, 8), bongos (8)
 Gene Page – orchestral arrangements (4)

Wembley Stadium, 21 June 1975
 Elton John – acoustic piano, lead vocals 
 James Newton Howard – keyboards
 Davey Johnstone – electric guitar, backing vocals
 Jeff "Skunk" Baxter – electric guitar, steel guitar
 Caleb Quaye – electric guitar
 Kenny Passarelli – bass guitar
 Roger Pope – drums
 Ray Cooper – percussion
 Donny Gerrard – backing vocals
 Brian Russell – backing vocals
 Brenda Russell – backing vocals

Production 
 Producer – Gus Dudgeon
 Engineer – Jeff Guercio
 Assistant Engineer – Mark Guercio
 Remixing – Gus Dudgeon and Phil Dunne
 Remastering – Tony Cousins
 Digital Transfers – Ricky Graham
 Art Direction and Graphic Conception – David Larkham and Bernie Taupin
Cover Design and Illustrations – Alan Aldridge and Harry Willock
 Booklet Illustrations – Alan Aldridge and John Hair
 Package Design – David Larkham
 Inner Sleeve Photography – Terry O'Neill
 Booklet Photos – Sam Emerson, David Larkham, Anthony Lowe, Michael Ross and Ian Vaughan.
 Liner Notes – John Tobler, Paul Gambaccini (Deluxe Edition)

Accolades

Grammy Awards

|-
|  style="width:35px; text-align:center;" rowspan="2"|1976 || rowspan="2"| Captain Fantastic and the Brown Dirt Cowboy || Album of the Year || 
|-
| Best Pop Vocal Performance – Male || 
|-

Charts

Weekly charts

Year-end charts

Certifications

References

External links

Elton John albums
1975 albums
Concept albums
Albums arranged by Gene Page
Albums produced by Gus Dudgeon
Albums with cover art by Alan Aldridge
DJM Records albums
MCA Records albums